Gordon McIlwham (born 13 November 1969) is a retired Scottish rugby union player for the amateur Glasgow Hawks, the professional teams Glasgow Rugby (now Glasgow Warriors), Bordeaux-Begles and Munster. He played as a Prop. He also played for Scotland at an international level.

Amateur level

McIlwham started out with Clarkston RFC.

References

External links
Munster profile

Scottish rugby union players
1969 births
Living people
Glasgow Warriors players
Glasgow Hawks players
Glasgow Southern players
Clarkston RFC players
Union Bordeaux Bègles players
Munster Rugby players
Scotland international rugby union players
Rugby union props